Adventures Unlimited may refer to:

 Adventures Unlimited Software Inc, a 1983 video game company
 Adventures Unlimited Press, a book publisher founded by David Hatcher Childress